Chachas District is one of fourteen districts of the province Castilla in Peru.

Geography 
The Chila mountain range traverses the district. Other mountains are listed below:

Machuqucha is the largest lake of the district. It lies on the border with the Orcopampa District.

See also 
 Chachas Lake

References

Districts of the Castilla Province
Districts of the Arequipa Region